Stefano Russo (born 6 March 1989) is an Italian footballer who plays as a goalkeeper.

Career

Lecce
Born in Nardò, the Province of Lecce, Apulia, Russo started his career at U.S. Lecce. He was the backup keeper for Ugo Gabrieli in the youth team. In 2007–08 and 2008–09 season, Russo left for Serie D clubs Virtus Casarano and Brindisi (both Apulia team) He won the promotion to the lowest level of the professional league, the fourth division as Group H winner.

Parma
In 2009, he was signed by Serie A club Parma. He succeed departed Andrea Gasparri as the first choice of the "spring" under-20 team, but as an overage player, ahead Antonio Santurro and Matteo Pisseri. Russo also beat Diego Manzoni to become the third keeper of the team, behind  Antonio Mirante and Nicola Pavarini, wearing no.22 which previously owned by Gasparri. The "spring" team entered the playoffs but eliminated by Lazio in the first round (round of 16)

In 2010–11 season he remained as a third keeper in the first team, ahead Santurro. Russo changed to wear no.16 shirt. He also played twice (round 10 and 19) for the "spring". Daniele Agosti succeed Russo as first choice that season but only played  out of 26 matches.

Nocerina (loan)
On 14 July 2011 he left for Serie B newcomer Nocerina. Russo picked No.89, his year of birth as shirt number. Russo was an understudy of Pier Graziano Gori. However Russo played 4 successive games since round 16 (19 November) In round 15 Nocerina only collected 12 points and was the least along with Ascoli if the latter did not have 10 points penalty. In January 2012 the club borrowed Emanuele Concetti, who became the first choice and Russo on the bench on round 22 (13 January).

Brescia
On 29 June 2012, he was swapped with Nicolò Belotti of Brescia Calcio. Both clubs retain 50% registration rights and both half of Belotti and Russo were valued €1.2 million, thus the deal did not involve cash. Russo signed a 3-year contract.

Ascoli (loan)
On 2 September 2013 both players returned to their mother clubs for €800,000 in 3-year (Belotti) and 2-year (Russo) deal respectively. Russo was immediately left for Ascoli in a temporary deal.

In 2014–15 season he received a call-up from Parma's pre-season camp, however he fail to enter the first team squad. On 25 July 2014 he was signed by Salernitana in a temporary deal, with an option to sign him outright.

Juve Stabia
On 14 July 2015 Russo was signed by Juve Stabia.

Vibonese

Salernitana
On 9 November 2017 he joined Salernitana on a free transfer.

Reggiana
On 12 November 2021, he signed with Reggiana until the end of the season.

Honours
Brindisi
 Serie D: 2009

References

External links
 Nocerina Profile 
 Football.it Profile 
 

1989 births
People from Nardò
Footballers from Apulia
Living people
Italian footballers
U.S. Lecce players
S.S.D. Città di Brindisi players
Parma Calcio 1913 players
A.S.G. Nocerina players
Brescia Calcio players
U.S. Salernitana 1919 players
Cavese 1919 players
A.C. Reggiana 1919 players
Serie B players
Serie C players
Serie D players
Association football goalkeepers
Sportspeople from the Province of Lecce
21st-century Italian people